The Mountain States League was a Class D and Class C minor league baseball league which operated in the United States from 1948 to 1954. The league was a Class D level league, becoming a Class C league during its final season in 1954. The league disbanded on July 20, 1954. The cities of Harlan, Kentucky, and Morristown, Tennessee, were represented for the full seven–year existence of the circuit.

History
A total of 16 teams competed in the Mountain States League. In 1954, the Morristown Red Sox team disbanded on May 15, and was replaced when the Maryville-Alcoa Twins moved to Morristown on June 19. Both the Morristown Twins and Lexington Colts disbanded on July 7.

Virgil Q. Wacks served as president for the duration of the league.

Cities represented
Big Stone Gap, VA: Big Stone Gap Rebels 1949–1953 
Harlan, KY: Harlan Smokies 1948–1954 
Hazard, KY: Hazard Bombers 1948–1952 
Jenkins, KY: Jenkins Cavaliers 1948–1951 
Kingsport, TN: Kingsport Cherokees 1953–1954
Knoxville, TN: Knoxville Smokies 1953
Lexington, KY: Lexington Colts 1954 
Maryville, TN & Alcoa, TN: Maryville-Alcoa Twins 1953–1954 
Middlesboro, KY: Middlesboro Athletics 1949–1954 
Morristown, TN: Morristown Red Sox 1948–1954; Morristown Twins 1954 
Newport, TN: Newport Canners 1948–1950 
Norton, VA: Norton Braves 1951–1953 
Oak Ridge, TN: Oak Ridge Bombers 1948; Oak Ridge Pioneers 1954 
Pennington Gap, VA: Pennington Gap Miners 1948–1951

Standings & statistics
1948 Mountain States League - schedule
 Oak Ridge moved to Hazard June 10 Playoffs: Morristown 3 games, Newport 2; Hazard 3 games, Pennington Gap 0. Finals: Morristown 3 games, Hazard 2.
  
1949 Mountain States League - schedule
 Playoffs: Harlan 3 games, Middlesboro 1; Morristown 3 games, Jenkins 2. Finals: Harlan 3 games, Morristown 2. 
 1950 Mountain States League - schedule
 Playoffs: Harlan 3 games, Big Stone Gap 1; Middlesboro 3 games, Hazard 0. Finals: Harlan 3 games, Middlesboro 0. 
 1951 Mountain States League - schedule
 Playoffs: Hazard 3 games, Harlan 0; Morristown 3 games, Middlesboro 0. Finals: Hazard 3 games, Morristown 0. 
1952 Mountain States League - schedule
 Playoffs: Morristown 3 games, Hazard 1; Harlan 3 games, Big Stone Gap 2. Finals: Harlan 3 games, Morristown 0. 
 1953 Mountain States League - schedule
 Playoffs: Maryville-Alcoa 3 games, Kingsport 2; Knoxville 3 games, Morristown 1. Finals: Knoxville 3 games, Maryville-Alcoa 1. 
 
1954 Mountain States League - schedule
Morristown disbanded May 15; Maryville–Alcoa moved to Morristown June 19, then disbanded July 7; Lexington disbanded July 20.The league disbanded July 20.

References

Johnson, Lloyd, and Wolff, Miles, eds., The Encyclopedia of Minor League Baseball, 3rd edition. Durham, North Carolina: Baseball America, 2007.

 
Defunct minor baseball leagues in the United States
Baseball leagues in Kentucky
Baseball leagues in Tennessee
Defunct professional sports leagues in the United States
1948 establishments in the United States
1954 disestablishments in the United States
Sports leagues established in 1948
Sports leagues disestablished in 1954